OpenFDA is a project indexing and formatting FDA data, and making it accessible to the public. The ultimate goal of enabling the data accessibility is to educate people and save lives.

The currently provided API of accessing data is under beta version. The project is open source and the code is available from GitHub.

External links
 The official website of OpenFDA
 The code on GitHub

Open data
Free culture movement